F48 may refer to:
 BMW X1 (F48), an automobile
 GER Class F48, a class of British steam locomotives
 , an ocean liner that served in the Royal Australian Navy
 , a Blackwood-class frigate of the Royal Navy
 , a Shivalik-class frigate of the Indian Navy
 Nocona Airport, in Montague County, Texas